A broadhead is an arrowhead used for war and hunting.

Broadhead may also refer to:

 Broadhead (physiology), a person with a congenital disorder which has caused the head to become broadened
 Broadhead (surname), a surname

See also

 Brodhead (disambiguation)